John Whitmore (November 16, 1893 – December 14, 1943) was an American architect. His work was part of the architecture event in the art competition at the 1932 Summer Olympics.

References

1893 births
1943 deaths
20th-century American architects
Olympic competitors in art competitions
People from Springfield, Massachusetts